The William Anzi Nichols House is a historic residence located east of Winterset, Iowa, United States.  Nichols bought an  farm in 1855 and owned the land until he died in 1867.  This house is an early example of a vernacular limestone farmhouse.  The 1½-story structure is composed of locally quarried finished cut and rubble limestone.  Its construction is attributed to David Harris who was known for laying the stones in a two against one broken bond.  The house was listed on the National Register of Historic Places in 1987.

References

Houses completed in 1856
Vernacular architecture in Iowa
Houses in Madison County, Iowa
National Register of Historic Places in Madison County, Iowa
Houses on the National Register of Historic Places in Iowa